Dietlof Siegfried Maré (2 July 1885 – 14 October 1913) was a South African international rugby union player. Born in Wellington, he attended Huguenot College before playing provincial rugby for Transvaal (now known as the Golden Lions). He made his only Test appearance for South Africa during their 1906–07 tour of Britain, Ireland and France. He played as a forward in the 1st Test of the tour, a 6–0 loss to Scotland at Hampden Park. Despite breaking two fingers after six minutes, he played the entire match. Off the field, he wrote the first handbook on rugby ever to be published in Afrikaans. In 1913, in Pretoria, Maré was killed in a car accident at the age of 28. As a result of the accident his wife used a wheelchair.

References

1885 births
1913 deaths
People from Wellington, Western Cape
Afrikaner people
South African rugby union players
South Africa international rugby union players
Rugby union forwards
Road incident deaths in South Africa
Rugby union players from the Western Cape
Golden Lions players